Shajahanpur Upazila is an upazila of Bogra District in the Division of Rajshahi, Bangladesh. Created in 2003, it is the newest upazila in the District.

Geography
It borders Bogra Sadar Upazila to the north, Gabtali and Dhunat upazilas to the east, Sherpur Upazila to the south, Nandigram Upazila to the southwest, and Kahaloo Upazila to the west. The Karatoya River flows south through the upazila.

Demographics

According to the 2011 Bangladesh census, Shajahanpur Upazila had 72,685 households and a population of 289,804, 21.4% of whom lived in urban areas. 8.9% of the population was under the age of 5. The literacy rate (age 7 and over) was 57.7%, compared to the national average of 51.8%.

Administration
Bogra Municipality falls mainly within Bogra Sadar Upazila, but a small part of the municipality (one ward, portions of two others, Majhira Cantonment, and Jahangirabad Cantonment) lies inside Shajahanpur Upazila. These wards are divided into 18 mahallas.  The remainder of the upazila is divided into nine union parishads: Amrool, Aria, Asekpur, Chopinagar, Gohail, Kharna, Khotta Para, Madla, and Majhira. The union parishads are subdivided into 120 mauzas and 166 villages.

Education

There are six colleges in the upazila.  There are two degree colleges- Kamaruddin Islamia College founded in 1986 and Dublagari College, founded in 1986.

Bogra Cantonment Public School and College, founded in 1979, is in Majhira Cantonment. Millennium Scholastic School & College, founded in 1998, is in Jahangiraba Cantonment.

Aria Rahimabad high school, founded in 2017, is in Nagarhat, Amrool Union.
The technical and vocational education system has one college, Ranirhat Technical College, founded in 2000.

The madrasa education system includes six fazil and two kamil madrasas.

See also
Upazilas of Bangladesh
Districts of Bangladesh
Divisions of Bangladesh

References

Upazilas of Bogra District